Beverley Marian McLachlin  (born September 7, 1943) is a Canadian jurist and author who served as the 17th chief justice of Canada from 2000 to 2017. She is the longest-serving chief justice in Canadian history and the first woman to hold the position.

In July 2018, McLachlin began a three-year term as a non-permanent judge on the Hong Kong Court of Final Appeal, the first Canadian jurist nominated to the post. She was re-appointed for a second three-year term in 2021.

Early life and education
McLachlin was born Beverley Gietz in Pincher Creek, Alberta, the eldest child of Eleanora Marian (née Kruschell) and Ernest Gietz. Her parents, who were of German descent, were "fundamentalist Christians" of the Pentecostal Church. She received a B.A. and an M.A. in philosophy as well as an LL.B. degree (winning the gold medal as top student, and serving as notes editor of the Alberta Law Review) from the University of Alberta. She was called to the bar of Alberta in 1969, and to the Bar of British Columbia in 1971. McLachlin practised law from 1969 until 1975. From 1974 to 1981, she was a professor at the University of British Columbia.

McLachlin has one son, Angus (born 1976), from her first marriage to Roderick McLachlin, who took care of much of Angus's upbringing. Roderick McLachlin died of cancer in 1988, a few days after she was appointed chief justice of the B.C. Supreme Court. In 1992, McLachlin married Frank McArdle, a lawyer and the executive director of the Canadian Superior Courts Judges Association.

Judicial career

Canada

In April 1981, McLachlin was appointed to the County Court of Vancouver. Five months later, in September 1981, she was appointed to the Supreme Court of British Columbia. In December 1985, McLachlin was appointed to the British Columbia Court of Appeal. In September 1988, McLachlin was appointed Chief Justice of the Supreme Court of British Columbia. She was nominated by Brian Mulroney to be made a puisne justice to the Supreme Court of Canada on March 30, 1989. On the advice of Jean Chrétien, McLachlin was appointed the chief justice of Canada on January 7, 2000.

Upon being sworn into the Supreme Court of Canada, she also became a deputy of the Governor General of Canada together with the other justices of the Supreme Court. When Governor General Adrienne Clarkson was hospitalized for a cardiac pacemaker operation on July 8, 2005, McLachlin performed the duties of the governor general as the administrator of Canada. In her role as administrator, she gave royal assent to the Civil Marriage Act which legalized same-sex marriage nationally in Canada. She relinquished that task when the governor general returned to good health in late July.

While she was Chief Justice, McLachlin chaired the Canadian Judicial Council. She is also on the board of governors of the National Judicial Institute and on the advisory council of the Order of Canada. She is a member of the Queen's Privy Council for Canada. McLachlin was made a commander of the Legion of Honour by the government of France in 2008. On December 15, 2006, she was appointed a commander of the Venerable Order of Saint John.

In July 2013, during the consultation period prior to appointment for Marc Nadon, Chief Justice McLachlin contacted justice minister Peter MacKay and the Prime Minister's Office regarding the eligibility of Marc Nadon for a Quebec seat on the Supreme Court. Prime Minister Stephen Harper stated that he had refused a phone call from McLachlin on the attorney general's advice. Harper's comments were criticized by the legal community and a complaint was forwarded to the International Commission of Jurists in Switzerland.  The International Commission of Jurists concluded that Beverly McLachlin deserved an apology from Harper, but none had been given as of July 2014.

In May 2015, McLachlin was invited to speak at the Global Centre for Pluralism, and said that Canada attempted to commit "cultural genocide" against aboriginal peoples in what she called the worst stain on Canada's human-rights record. University of Regina academic Ken Coates supported McLachlin, and said that she was "only stating what is clearly in the minds of judges, lawyers and aboriginal people across the country". Others were less sympathetic. Columnist Lysiane Gagnon called the comments "unacceptable" and "highly inflammatory" and suggested that McLachlin had opened herself up to accusations of prejudice. Gordon Gibson, another columnist, said the use of the word "genocide" was incendiary and disproportionate and that the Chief Justice's comments made her sound like a legislator.

McLachlin retired from the Supreme Court on December 15, 2017, nine months before reaching the mandatory retirement age of 75. Her successor as Chief Justice of Canada is Richard Wagner, who was nominated by Prime Minister Justin Trudeau in 2017. Her successor as a justice of the court is Sheilah Martin, who was nominated by Prime Minister Justin Trudeau through a new process for judicial appointments to the Supreme Court of Canada that permitted, "any Canadian lawyer or judge who fits a specified criteria" to apply.

Hong Kong

McLachlin was nominated in March 2018 to become a non-permanent member of the Court of Final Appeal in Hong Kong. The court appoints foreign judges from common-law jurisdictions outside of Hong Kong, of which McLachlin is the first Canadian, to sit as non-permanent members of the court. Her three-year appointment was approved by the Hong Kong Legislative Council, and the chief executive gazetted the appointment effective July 30, 2018. McLachlin's appointment was accompanied by those of Brenda Hale, also as non-permanent judge, and Andrew Cheung, as permanent judge, at the court. She was reappointed to the court in 2021 for a second three-year term. Her service on the court has been criticized amidst the Hong Kong pro-democracy protests and imposition of the National Security Law, which is seen by Western observers as threatening civil liberties in the city. As a Court of Final Appeal judge, McLachlin would be required to uphold the law in appellate judgements.  A motion at the Law Society of Ontario to condemn her appointment was defeated 28–17 in February 2021. In June 2022, she announced her decision to remain on the court which she believes to still be independent.

Judicial philosophy 
McLachlin has defined the judicial function as one that requires conscious objectivity, which she has described as follows:

McLachlin has argued that courts may be justified in changing the law where such a change would accord with changes in society's values. She regards Edwards v Canada (Attorney General), in which the Judicial Committee of the Privy Council found that women were entitled to sit in the Senate of Canada, as a paradigm case in Canadian law. She has stated "courts are the ultimate guardians of the rights of society, in our system of government." She has also stated, "I think the court belongs to the Canadian people and it should reflect the Canadian people."

McLachlin has defended the view that "legal certainty"—the notion that there is one correct answer to a legal question, which judges can discover with diligence—is a "myth".

Mahmud Jamal, now a puisne justice of the Supreme Court of Canada, has argued that McLachlin's jurisprudence on the law of federalism is consistent with her "self-described judicial philosophy", namely that judges are to be "scrupulously non-partisan and impartial".

Writing 
In 2018, McLachlin published a legal thriller novel titled Full Disclosure. Her memoir Truth Be Told: My Journey Through Life and the Law, was published in 2019. It won the Shaughnessy Cohen Prize for Political Writing in 2020.

Honours and awards

McLachlin is the honorary patron of the Institute of Parliamentary and Political Law. From 2016 to 2020, she was a college visitor at Massey College. In 2017, she was elected Visitor of Queens' College, Cambridge. She has been awarded with over 31 honorary degrees from various universities, which include:

 Order of Saint John – Commander

Memberships and fellowships

See also
 List of Supreme Court of Canada cases (McLachlin Court)

Selected publications

Books

Articles

References

Further reading

External links
 

1943 births
Living people
20th-century Canadian judges
20th-century women judges
21st-century Canadian judges
21st-century Canadian non-fiction writers
21st-century Canadian novelists
21st-century Canadian women writers
21st-century women judges
Canadian legal scholars
Canadian legal writers
Canadian memoirists
Canadian people of German descent
Canadian thriller writers
Canadian women judges
Canadian women lawyers
Canadian women memoirists
Canadian women novelists
Chief justices of Canada
Commanders of the Order of St John
Commandeurs of the Légion d'honneur
Companions of the Order of Canada
Constitutional court women judges
Judges in British Columbia
Justices of the Court of Final Appeal (Hong Kong)
Hong Kong judges
Lawyers in British Columbia
People from the Municipal District of Pincher Creek No. 9
University of Alberta alumni
University of Alberta Faculty of Law alumni
Academic staff of the University of British Columbia
Women chief justices
Women legal scholars